The Roche de la Muzelle (3,465m) is the most western peak of the Massif des Ecrins. Located near Les Deux Alpes, the mountain - with its beautiful pyramid - dominates the resort from the south.

Guides 

 Le massif des ecrins - les 100 plus belles courses et randonnées, by Gaston Rebuffat

References

External links
 Classical route on la Muzelle

Mountains of the Alps
Alpine three-thousanders
Mountains of Isère